Rossendale may refer to several places and organizations in Lancashire, England:

Places
Rossendale Valley, a river valley
Borough of Rossendale, a local government district
Rossendale (UK Parliament constituency), a former parliamentary constituency

Organizations
Rossendale Bus, a bus company
Rossendale RUFC, a rugby union team
Rossendale F.C., a former football club
Rossendale United F.C., a former football club